Srđan Jovanović (born 1 March 1976) is a Serbian-Greek professional basketball coach and former player, who is the current head coach for Avijeh Sanat Parsa Mashhad of the Iranian Basketball Super League. He holds Greek citizenship, under the name of Srtzan Karageorgiou.

Playing career 
Jovanović had two stints with the Crvena zvezda of the Yugoslav League. In the 1992–93 season, he won the Yugoslav League with Crvena zvezda and played together with Dragoljub Vidačić, Nebojša Ilić, Saša Obradović, Mileta Lisica, Predrag Stojaković, Rastko Cvetković, Aleksandar Trifunović and Dejan Tomašević. Later, he also played the 2001–02 season for the Zvezda. During the 2004–05 season, he played for his hometown team Atlas of the First League of Serbia & Montenegro.

In Italy, Jovanović played for the Stefanel Milano, the Telit Trieste and the Poliform Cantù of the Lega Serie A and for the Esse.Ti Imola of the Serie A2.

In Greece, Jovanović played for the Aris BSA Thessaloniki, the Makedonikos of the Greek League and for the Xanthi of the Greek A2 League.

In later stage of his career Jovanović played in Hungary (Kecskeméti KTE and PVSK Panthers), Poland (Kotwica Kołobrzeg and Świecie) and Iran (Shahrekord). He retired as a player with Xanthi in 2010.

Coaching career 
In 2019, Jovanović was hired as the head coach for Avijeh Sanat Parsa Mashhad of the Iranian Basketball Super League.

Career achievements and awards 
 Yugoslav League champion: 1 (with Crvena zvezda: 1992–93)

References

External links
 Player Profile at eurobasket.com

1976 births
Living people
Aris B.C. players
Basketball players from Belgrade
Greek Basket League players
Greek men's basketball players
Greek expatriate basketball people in Serbia
Greek people of Serbian descent
Guards (basketball)
Kecskeméti TE (basketball) players
KK Beopetrol/Atlas Beograd players
KK Crvena zvezda players
Makedonikos B.C. players
Olimpia Milano players
Pallacanestro Cantù players
Pallacanestro Trieste players
PVSK Panthers players
Serbian men's basketball coaches
Serbian men's basketball players
Serbian expatriate basketball people in Greece
Serbian expatriate basketball people in Iran
Serbian expatriate basketball people in Italy
Serbian expatriate basketball people in Hungary
Serbian expatriate basketball people in Poland
Serbian expatriate basketball people in Romania